"There Goes My Heart Again" is a song recorded by American country music artist Holly Dunn.  It was released in September 1989 as the second single from the album The Blue Rose of Texas.  The song reached #4 on the Billboard Hot Country Singles & Tracks chart. Joe Diffie, who co-wrote the song with Lonnie Wilson and Wayne Perry, sings backing vocals on it.

Chart performance

References

1989 singles
Holly Dunn songs
Songs written by Joe Diffie
Warner Records singles
Songs written by Wayne Perry (country music)
1989 songs
Songs written by Lonnie Wilson